Elections were held in the Australian state of Queensland on 29 March 1941 to elect the 62 members of the state's Legislative Assembly. The Labor government of Premier William Forgan Smith was seeking a fourth term in office.

Key dates

Results

Seats changing party representation
This table lists changes in party representation at the 1941 election.

 The incumbent member for Gregory, Charles Brown won this seat from Labor at the 1939 by-election.

See also
 Members of the Queensland Legislative Assembly, 1938–1941
 Members of the Queensland Legislative Assembly, 1941–1944
 Candidates of the Queensland state election, 1941
 Forgan Smith Ministry

Notes

References

Elections in Queensland
1941 elections in Australia
1940s in Queensland
March 1941 events